Falchion was a Finnish heavy metal/death metal band formed in 2002. Their debut album, Legacy of Heathens, was released in 2005. The vocalist and lead guitarist Juho Kauppinen and drummer Matti Johansson formerly performed with the Finnish folk metal group Korpiklaani, as the accordion player and drummer, respectively, before Juho's departure in 2013, and Matti's departure in 2019. The band dissolved in 2009.

Members

Final Line-Up
 Juho Kauppinen − unclean vocals, lead guitar, accordion (2002-2009)
 Matti Johansson - drums (2005-2009)
 Janne Kielinen - bass (2005-2009)
 Toni Tieaho − rhythm guitar (2008-2009)

Previous members
 Jani Laine - rhythm guitar (2002-2003, 2003-2004, 2004-2005)
 Seppo Tiaskorpi - bass (2002-2005)
 Teemu Peltonen - drums (2003-2005)
 Sami Heinonen - rhythm guitar (2003, 2004)
 Miikka Tulimäki - rhythm guitar (2005-2008)
 Joonas Simonen - keyboards (2002-2003)
 Sampsa Savijärvi - rhythm guitar, clean vocals (2006)

Timeline

Discography 
 2003 - Glory of the Sword (EP)
 2005 - Legacy of Heathens
 2008 - Chronicles of the Dead

External links 
 

Finnish heavy metal musical groups
Finnish melodic death metal musical groups
Finnish folk metal musical groups
Musical groups established in 2002
Musical groups disestablished in 2009
Musical quartets
2002 establishments in Finland